Pseudamara arenaria is a species of beetle in the family Carabidae, the only species in the genus Pseudamara.

References

Pterostichinae